The Far Eastern Bureau of the Communist International was an organ of the Communist International established in 1921 to develop their political influence in the Far East. The name was used in subsequent years, but the continuity of the organisation cannot be proven.

The organisation was originally founded as the Far Eastern Bureau of the Russian Communist Party, when the central committee of that organisation sent Vladimir Vilensky-Sibiryakov to Siberia as plenipotentiary for Far Eastern Affairs. Grigori Voitinsky was soon sent to China, where he supported the foundation of the Chinese Communist Party.

References

See also 
 :zh:共产国际与中国#远东局
 Pan-Pacific Trade Union Secretariat
 Communist University of the Toilers of the East
 Moscow Sun Yat-sen University

Comintern